A Commonwealth XI cricket team toured Ceylon, India and Pakistan from October 1949 to March 1950 and played 21 first-class matches, including five against an All-India XI.

Captained by Jock Livingston, who also kept wicket in some games, the team had several well-known players including Frank Worrell, George Tribe, Bill Alley, Cec Pepper, George Dawkes and George Pope. Most of the players were professionals in the Lancashire League or the Central Lancashire League. About half the team were Australians, two were West Indians, and the rest were English.

Matches
The first-class matches are numbered.

References

Notes

External links
 Commonwealth in India, 1949-50 at Cricinfo
 Commonwealth XI in India, Pakistan and Ceylon 1949/50 at CricketArchive (subscription required)

1949 in Indian cricket
1949 in Pakistani cricket
1950 in Ceylon
1950 in Indian cricket
Indian cricket seasons from 1945–46 to 1969–70
International cricket competitions from 1945–46 to 1960
Multi-national cricket tours of India
Multi-national cricket tours of Pakistan
Multi-national cricket tours of Sri Lanka
Pakistani cricket seasons from 1947–48 to 1969–70
Sri Lankan cricket seasons from 1880–81 to 1971–72